"Four on the Floor" is a song by Australian alternative rock band, Spiderbait and was released in August 2001 as the lead single from the band's fifth studio album The Flight of Wally Funk. "Four on the Floor" peaked at number 91 on the Australian chart and ranked at number 89 on Triple J's Hottest 100 in 2001.

Track listings

Charts

Release history

References

 

2001 singles
2001 songs
Spiderbait songs
Song recordings produced by Magoo (Australian producer)
Universal Music Australia singles